Allison Razey 'Alan' McCrory (26 February 1918 – 24 April 1985) was an Australian rules footballer who played for the Richmond Football Club and South Melbourne Football Club in the Victorian Football League (VFL).

A key position player, McCrory also played for Oakleigh Football Club in the Victorian Football Association in 1940.  He joined the Royal Australian Air Force towards the end of World War II, and later moved to Queensland where he worked as an airport fire officer until his retirement in 1974.

Notes

External links 

Alan McCrory's playing statistics from The VFA Project

1918 births
1985 deaths
VFL/AFL players born outside Australia
Australian rules footballers from Victoria (Australia)
Richmond Football Club players
Sydney Swans players
Oakleigh Football Club players
Royal Australian Air Force personnel of World War II
Irish emigrants to Australia